Ellobius is a genus of rodents in the family Cricetidae. It is the only member of the tribe Ellobiusini. It contains two (E. lutescens and E. tancrei) of the handful of examples of mammal species that have lost the Y chromosome.

The genus has the following species:
 Alai mole vole (Ellobius alaicus)
 Southern mole vole (Ellobius fuscocapillus)
 Transcaucasian mole vole (Ellobius lutescens)
 Northern mole vole (Ellobius talpinus)
 Zaisan mole vole (Ellobius tancrei)

See also
Tokudaia

References

 
Rodent genera
Taxa named by Gotthelf Fischer von Waldheim
Taxonomy articles created by Polbot